The Sigma 30mm F2.8 EX DN is a standard prime lens for Sony E and Micro Four-Thirds mounts, announced by Sigma  in January 2012. Along with the Sigma 19mm F2.8 EX DN, it was part of the first release of Sigma lenses for compact interchangeable lens cameras, and hence the inception of the "DN" line, created by Sigma to cater to these cameras, an offering that in January 2013 was expanded with another lens, the Sigma 60mm f/2.8 DN Art.

Construction
The lens has a matte black plastic exterior but features a metal mount.

Image quality 
Sharpness is already very high wide open and across the frame. Stopping down yields excellent resolution.

Chromatic aberration is well controlled as is vignetting. Distortion is barrel shaped on a low level.

One drawback is that this lens is slow (2.8) compared to other standard prime lenses which usually have a max aperture of 1.4 - 1.8. But it image quality, its small size and low weight makes this lens an ideal partner for APS-C and MFT cameras.

"Art" series version
An aesthetically updated version, the Sigma 30mm F2.8 DN Art was announced by Sigma on January 29, 2013. It has a glossy black (or silver) plastic exterior with the Sigma Art "A" badge on the side of the lens. It features a large manual focus ring and a detachable barrel-type lens hood.

The optics are identical to the original version.

See also
 List of third-party E-mount lenses
 List of Micro Four Thirds lenses

References

30
Camera lenses introduced in 2013
Sigma 30 2.8 EX